History of Science and Technology is a biannual peer-reviewed academic journal covering the history of science and technology. It is published by State University of Infrastructure and Technologies (Ukraine) and was established in 2011.

Abstracting and indexing
The journal is abstracted and indexed in Scopus.

References

Publications established in 2011
History of science and technology
History of science journals